Polymixis lichenea, the feathered ranunculus, is a moth of the family Noctuidae. It is found in western Europe and Morocco. It is mainly found in coastal areas.

Technical description and variation

The wingspan is 35–40 mm. Forewing dark to light green, varied with reddish along the inner margin and the course of the lines and round the stigmata; inner and outer lines grey, double; submarginal line pale, preceded by rufous wedge shaped marks; claviform stigma small, dark; orbicular and reniform whitish, often dusted with grey, with dark centres and blackish outlines; fringe green; hindwing of male white, of female light or dark grey, with grey discal spot and outer, sometimes also a submarginal, line; in the form viridicincta Frr. the ground colour is grey tinged with olive, the central fascia generally darker olive, all the red tints replaced by dark green; tephra Geyer is a paler grey form with the green tints also obsolete; aetnea Turati, from Sicily, is blackish, the markings on forewing distinct.

Biology
Adults are on wing from August to October.

Larva pale green or brownish mottled with darker; spiracular line pale; head yellowish. The larvae feed on various low-growing plants, including Sedum acre and Armeria maritima.

References

External links

Funet Taxonomy
Lepiforum.de
Vlindernet.nl 

Cuculliinae
Moths described in 1813
Moths of Africa
Moths of Europe
Taxa named by Jacob Hübner